Miriam Slater (born February 9, 1952, Los Angeles, California) is an American artist who paints both objects and paintings. She studied painting at California State University, Fullerton. After graduating in 1975 she began exhibiting in Los Angeles in shows such as “Imagination” curated by Llyn Foulkes at LAICA. She developed a celebrity clientele including Jack Nicholson, Brooke Astor, Quincy Jones and Jeff Bridges. From 1980 to 1990 she studied figure drawing with Harry Carmean at Art Center College of Design in Pasadena and exhibited at the Tobey Moss Gallery in Los Angeles with Lorser Feitelson and Helen Lundeberg.

Her work is in several museums including the Los Angeles County Museum of Art and the Experience Music Project Museum in Seattle.  Miriam Slater is the daughter of hard edge artist Eva Slater and is married to figurative artist Harry Carmean.  She lives in Santa Barbara, California.

Television & Radio 
2011 “Arts and Antique Show” featured guest, AM 1290, Santa Barbara, 3/19/11
2008 "Carmean/Slater, the Figurative Tradition", 2007, Channel 21, Santa Barbara CA
2008 "Creative Community", featured guest 2007, Channel 21 Santa Barbara, CA

References 

"http://www.apartmenttherapy.com/la/workspace/harry-miriams-artistic-creative-spaces--150522"
"Belly Dance Magazine", 2010
"The Figurative Tradition: Life Drawings of Harry Carmean and Miriam Slater", Westmont College, Montecito, CA 2007, p. 32-39
"Book of Cups, Garth Clark, Abbeyville Press", 1990, p. 54-5,57
"Artists Design Furniture", D, Domergue, Abrams Publishing, 1984, p. 146-7
"Rollerbabies", Cantu, Steinburg, Prentiss-Hall, 1979, p. 129,138-9
"Los Angeles Magazine", Feb. 1989,  p. 180-3
"California Magazine", Dec. 1984, p. 114-5

External links 
MiriamSlater.com
MiriamSlaterArt.com

20th-century American painters
21st-century American painters
Living people
1952 births
American women painters
20th-century American women artists
21st-century American women artists